There were rumors and speculations regarding the existence of a property bubble in Bulgaria since at least 2006; however, many interested parties (especially banks) tended to discredit such a possibility. Most of all, since the property bubble has been the driving force in GDP growth in Bulgaria most players in the market, including government have been satisfied with the situation.

Dynamics 
Provided that growth in GDP continued and that property prices had been sustained during the Financial crisis, there was a possibility that the growth of the bubble would return in late 2009, or early 2010. However, since October 2008 there has been sharp drop in the real estate market, including:
 fewer property buyers
 considerable drop in property prices
 sharp decrease in property sales
 many real estate companies have closed or temporary suspended operations
Among other reasons the current property bubble burst, there is the factor of increased interest rates and bank requirements to provide mortgages, which were part of the reason why the previous conditions of late 2005 and early 2006 had provided for easy access to loans for many Bulgarians.
It may be accurate to say that the beginning of the bubble burst occurred somewhere around July–August 2008; however, the visible tipping point is October 2008. Analyzing several different sources, including media, several online portals and property experts, the burst was long expected, and the Global Financial crisis was only the catalyst of events, since most financial institutions in Bulgaria are foreign investments.

The contribution of foreign investment to the Bulgarian property market has been significant.  In 2006, more than 29% of property deals were signed by foreigners, more than half of whom were UK citizens.  Various companies, such as Bulgarian Dreams, actively marketed Bulgarian properties to buyers overseas.

References

Economic history of Bulgaria
Economy of Bulgaria
Real estate bubbles